Albany wind and Grasmere farms are two wind power stations near Albany, Western Australia, owned by Bright Energy Investments. They are adjacent and are often considered a single facility. They have 18 wind turbines, with a maximum generating capacity of 35.4 MW of electricity. The original Albany Wind Farm was commissioned in October 2001, after ten years of planning. The wind farm has the capacity to produce 80 per cent of the electricity requirements of Albany.

Originally commissioned in 2001 the farm was the largest of its kind in Australia.
The farm originally had 12 wind turbines, with 6 extra turbines installed in 2011 as the Grasmere Wind Farm. The nose cone which the blades attach to weighs around 14 tonnes. At the time of construction these turbines were the largest installed in the southern hemisphere. The turbines operate automatically, with the three blades adjusted to make best use of power output from any wind direction or strength. They have been designed to withstand the strongest winds likely in Albany and incorporate special lightning protection. The 6 new turbines installed in 2011 are ENERCON model E70 with a rating of 2.3 MW. The turbines were made in Germany.

The height and locality is designed to maximise exploitation of local wind conditions, and combined with the short distance to the main electricity transmission system make this an outstanding wind farm site.

The farms also acts as a tourist attraction in Albany. When built 200,000 was spent on board walks, viewing towers, interpretive displays and picnic areas on and around the site. The road to the site underwent a 400,000 upgrade for better access for visitors. The Bibbulmun Track also traverses the site and had to be re-aligned toward the cliffs and stabilized.

See also

Wind power in Australia

External links 
Albany Wind Farm page by Verve Energy

References

Wind farms in Western Australia
Buildings and structures in Albany, Western Australia
Tourist attractions in Western Australia